Over Silton Manor is in the middle of the village of Over Silton in North Yorkshire, England. "The village of Over silton, 1994;39"

History

There are various references to a manor house prior to 1800 but we cannot be sure whether this is Nether or Over Silton. At that time Over Silton and all the Hillside Villages down to Coxwold were part of the Newburgh Estate. So this would imply that there was no need for a manor house, as the lords lived at the Newburgh Priory in Coxwold.

In the early 1800s the Lords of Newburgh Estate were the Belasyse family, known as the Earls of Fauconberg. This line ended in 1825 due to a lack of male heirs. Sir George Wombwell inherited the Newburgh estate and on his death was succeeded by his eldest son, Sir George Orby Wombwell.

Relics can be seen of Sir George Orby Wombwell’s ownership of Over Silton, his initials GOW on the gable end of Keepers Cottage is identical to many of the cottages in Coxwold village.

Sir George sold Over Silton Estate, which included the village, surrounding farms and moorland, in 1866 to William Bradley Wainman and he built Over Silton Manor.

William Bradley Wainman was from Carr Head Hall, Cowling, West Riding and was a wealthy landowner, his family making a fortune from the woollen industry in the 17th century.

Carr Head Hall was the family home of the Wainmans for nearly 300 years and various similarities to Over Silton Manor can be noted in the surrounding architecture. William Bradley Wainman used materials and employed stonemasons from the Cowling area and they would be influenced by the fashion in the West Riding.

William Bradley Wainman was a strong supporter of field sports and built Over Silton Manor as a country retreat for the purposes of his passion for shooting.  The moorland area surrounding Over Silton provided excellent grouse shooting, the basin providing the birds with an ideal natural sanctuary. Although now prominently woodland (planted in the 1950s by the Forestry Commission) in the time of William Bradley Wainman this would have been the edge of the moorland, covered in heather and gorse and providing the natural habitat.

Near the entrance gates to Over Silton Manor is the grave of a Laverack Setter, which at that time was the ultimate type of hunting dog in the country, and preceded the English Setter.  On research into this dog breed, some of the dogs exchanged hands for over 80 guineas, which in today’s terms is the equivalent of a 3-bed house!

It is doubtful that William Bradley Wainman ever actually lived at Over Silton Manor, but he probably did visit regularly and classed it as his second home, as on his gravestone it states him being of Carr Head and Over Silton - (the gravestone being at Kildwick Church near Cowling)

On the death of William Bradley Wainman at the age of 59, having owned Over Silton Estate for just 6 years, his eldest daughter, Mary Amelia, inherited the family home at Carr Head and Edith Hinde, his second daughter, inherited the Over Silton estate.

Over Silton Estate was passed to Miss Hinde (their only child) and she was known by her tenants as being a recluse and quite pedantic in nature. Stories are that she would arrive at the village unannounced and walk up the village inspecting the upkeep of the gardens. Miss Hinde lived in hotels and did not have a home.

Country houses in North Yorkshire
Manor houses in England